John Bezear (born 28 August 1979) is a Canadian international lawn bowler.

Bowls career
He won a bronze medal in the Men's pairs at the 2012 World Outdoor Bowls Championship in Adelaide. In 2020, he was selected for the 2020 World Outdoor Bowls Championship in Australia.

In 2022, he competed in the men's pairs and the men's fours at the 2022 Commonwealth Games.

References

External links
 John Bezear at Bowls Canada
 

1979 births
Living people
Canadian male bowls players
Commonwealth Games competitors for Canada
Bowls players at the 2022 Commonwealth Games
21st-century Canadian people